Revaz Gurgenidze (born July 9, 1986) is a Russian male acrobatic gymnast. With his partner Anna Katchalova, he achieved silver in the 2004 World Sports Acrobatics Championships and gold in the 2006 Acrobatic Gymnastics World Championships. With his partner Tatiana Okulova, he achieved silver in the 2010 Acrobatic Gymnastics World Championships and 2012 Acrobatic Gymnastics World Championships. He and his partner, Marina Chernova, achieved gold in the 2014 Acrobatic Gymnastics World Championships.

With Anna Katchalova, Gurgenidze won the 2005 World Games gold medal. Eight years later Gurgenidze and Chernova missed bronze by half a point and finished fourth.

References

External links
 

1986 births
Living people
Russian acrobatic gymnasts
Male acrobatic gymnasts
Medalists at the Acrobatic Gymnastics World Championships
World Games gold medalists
Competitors at the 2005 World Games
21st-century Russian people